The Rational Optimist is a 2010 popular science book by Matt Ridley, author of The Red Queen: Sex and the Evolution of Human Nature. The book primarily focuses on the benefits of the innate human tendency to trade goods and services. Ridley argues that this trait, together with the specialization linked to it, is the source of modern human civilization, and that, as people increasingly specialize in their skill sets, we will have increased trade and more prosperity.

Reception
Bill Gates praised the book for critiquing opposition to international aid, but criticised the book for under-representing global catastrophic risks. Ricardo Salinas Pliego praised the book as a defence of free trade and globalisation. Michael Shermer gave the book positive reviews in Nature and Scientific American before going on to present similar ideas in conference talks, and writing The Moral Arc partly in response. David Papineau praised the book for refuting "doomsayers who insist that everything is going from bad to worse".

George Monbiot criticised the book in his Guardian column.
 Critics of the book say it fails to address wealth inequality, and other criticisms of globalization.

See also
 The Moral Arc
 The Better Angels of Our Nature

References

External links
 Official site
  (talk presented on June 23, 2010)

Books by Matt Ridley
2010 non-fiction books
HarperCollins books